The Tucson, Arizona mayoral election of 2011 occurred on November 8, 2011 to select the next mayor of Tucson, and occurred simultaneously with the elections to the Tucson City Council wards 1, 2 and 4. Although not term-limited, incumbent mayor Bob Walkup did not run for re-election,  leaving Tucson's chief executive office open and competitive, with seven candidates filing to run in the race.

Background
Because elections in Tucson are partisan in nature, party primaries were held on August 30, 2011. 

Current Republican Mayor Bob Walkup did not run for re-election to a third term. Traditionally, Tucson is a Democratic stronghold with its position as a university town and its large Hispanic American population (41.6% of the city's population according to the 2010 Census). Thus, a change of party control of the mayoralty was seen as a strong possibility.

For the first time in Tucson, all of the elections (mayor and city council) were conducted via mail, due to a decision by the city council in April.

Nominations
Primaries for the Democratic. Green, Libertarian, and Republican parties were held August 30, 2011.

Democratic primary 
Originally political newcomer Marshall Home had registered to challenge incumbent Jonathan Rothschild.

Green primary

Libertarian primary

Republican primary
Republicans nominated Rick Grinnell

Independent candidates
Originally, Pat Darcy had registered to run as an independent.

Write-in candidates
Joseph Maher Jr.

General election

References

Mayoral elections in Tucson, Arizona
Tucson
Tucson